The South Yorkshire Aircraft Museum (SYAM) is a Volunteer led museum located at Lakeside in Doncaster, South Yorkshire, England. It occupies the former site of the Royal Air Force Station, RAF Doncaster. The museum occupies the last remaining original buildings from RAF Doncaster in the shape of a Bellman hangar, two wooden 'Billet Huts' (Buildings 19 and 21) and various smaller structures. The Museum have also erected an Air Training Corps Cadet Hut alongside Building 21 to house its World War Two Collection.

The museum is also home to the Yorkshire Helicopter Preservation Group (YHPG) who relocated from the Yorkshire Air Museum at Elvington, near York in July 2002. The YHPG display their collection of helicopters among the exhibits at SYAM (With the exception of Westland Dragonfly HAR3 WN499, which remains at Elvington), and have an onsite workshop for continued restoration of their aircraft.

Aircraft on display 
The South Yorkshire Aircraft Museum has a wide range of aircraft on display from the earliest days of aviation, through to modern military fast jets. The museum also hosts a large collection of Civilian aircraft and gliders. The South Yorkshire Aircraft Museum is also home to the largest permanent display remembering and honouring the men and women who fought during the Falklands War, with a collection of aircraft on display having been flown during the conflict, or representative of their type. The museum also preserves a large collection of aircraft with links to the local area, many having flown from local airfields such as RAF Finningley, Doncaster Sheffield Airport and Doncaster Airfield (the former RAF Doncaster).

The museum also has many exhibits which have been painstakingly restored by the volunteers, notably Avro Vulcan B.2 XL388, Bristol Sycamore HR.14 XE317, Gloster Meteor T.7 WA667 and Cessna 150 G-AVAA.

Aircraft with local links 
These aircraft listed below are significant to the aviation history of the Doncaster Area having flown from local airfields.

 De Havilland Dove G-ARUM/G-DDCD. Used by the National Coal Board as an Executive Transport aircraft and regularly flown into Doncaster Airfield.
 Handley Page Jetstream XX495. Flown from RAF Finningley. The aircraft was donated to the museum by Bedford College in 2018.
 Hawker Siddeley HS.125 Dominie T.1 XS735. Flown from RAF Finningley.
 Piper PA-23 Apache G-APMY. United Steel Transport aircraft, Regularly flown into Scunthorpe Steelworks.
 Vickers Varsity WJ903. Flown from RAF Finningley.
 Taylorcraft Auster AOP.1 LB314. Flown from RAF Firbeck (The museum's original site) during the Second World War. The Aircraft was transported by Museum Volunteers from Denmark in 2018 and is now on display in Building 21, where it retains its Civil Registration of OY-DSZ.
Grumman American AA-1B G-BCLW. Flown from RAF Finningley by one of the flying schools, G-BCLW was written off in 2013 after the propeller contacted the nose wheel spat during a heavy landing and the insurance company assessed the damage as uneconomical to repair. G-BCLW was first based at Doncaster Airfield, the museum's current site.

Falklands Collection 
The aircraft listed below have links to the Falklands War and are on display at the South Yorkshire Aircraft Museum.

 Westland Wessex HU.5 XS481.
 Gazelle AH.1 XX411 of 3 Commando Brigade Air Squadron, was shot down on the first day of the landings by small arms fire off Port San Carlos and  Pilot Sergeant Evans - RM was killed.  The airframe was recovered on 20 October 1982 and returned to Middle Wallop for potential repair but was assessed as a structural loss.
 Aermacchi MB-339 4-A-116. One of three Argentinian MB339's captured by British forces during the Falklands War and the only one returned to the UK. Displayed at the Fleet Air Arm Museum for a short period before being used by Rolls-Royce and painted in a white scheme. Recently returned to its original Argentinian markings.
 Bell Huey UH-1H Iroquois AE-406. Flown by the Aviacion de Ejercito Argentino EA (Argentinian Army Aviation) and captured by British forces during the Falklands War.
 Westland Scout AH.1 XV139. Flown during the Falklands War by 656 Squadron AAC, while on tasking at Port Harriet House on 9 June 1982, XV139 was fired at by an Argentine Blowpipe missile, which missed by less than 25 yards.

See also
List of aerospace museums

References

External links 

Official website

List of museums in South Yorkshire
Aerospace museums in England